KRT26 is a keratin gene.